Francesco Rusticucci (died 1587) was a Roman Catholic prelate who served as Bishop of Fano (1567–1587) and Bishop of Venosa (1566–1567).

Biography
On 21 August 1566, Francesco Rusticucci was appointed during the papacy of Pope Pius V as Bishop of Venosa.
On 21 September 1566, he was consecrated bishop by Scipione Rebiba, Cardinal-Priest of Sant'Anastasia, with Giulio Antonio Santorio, Archbishop of Santa Severina, and Carlo Grassi, Bishop of Corneto (Tarquinia) e Montefiascone, serving as co-consecrators. 
On 31 January 1567, he was appointed by Pope Pius V as Bishop of Fano. 
He served as Bishop of Fano until his death in 1587.

Episcopal succession
While bishop, he was the principal co-consecrator of:

References

External links and additional sources
 (for Chronology of Bishops) 
 (for Chronology of Bishops) 
 (for Chronology of Bishops) 
 (for Chronology of Bishops)  

16th-century Italian Roman Catholic bishops
Bishops appointed by Pope Pius V
1587 deaths